Neuroenhancement or cognitive enhancement refers to the targeted enhancement and extension of cognitive and affective abilities based on an understanding of their underlying neurobiology in healthy persons who do not have any mental illness and outcomes in experimental research. As such, it can be thought of as an umbrella term that encompasses pharmacological and non-pharmacological methods of improving neurological functionality, especially interventions designed to improve human form or functioning beyond what is necessary to sustain or restore good health, as well as the overarching ethico-legal discourse that accompanies these aims and practices.

Neuroenhancers reliably engender substantial cognitive, social, psychological, mood, or motor benefits beyond normal functioning in healthy individuals, whilst causing few side effects, albeit broader definitions also include the use of psychoactive substances that are deemed unhealthy or have substantial side effects. Pharmacological neuroenhancement agents include well-validated nootropics, such as modafinil, citicoline, Bacopa monnieri, phosphatidylserine, and caffeine, as well as other drugs used for treating patients with neurological disorders.

Non-pharmacological measures of cognitive enhancement include behavioral methods (activities, techniques, and changes), non-invasive brain stimulation, which has been employed to improve various cognitive and affective functions, and brain-machine interfaces, which hold much potential to extend the repertoire of motor and cognitive capacities.

Pharmacological

There are many nootropics, which include smart drugs and dietary supplements, and all or many of these are relevant to neuroenhancement, albeit many or most only have small effect sizes in healthy individuals or common major side effects. The most common, popular or notable pharmacological agents in neuroenhancement with potentials for significant effect sizes (as in at least as effective or similar to caffeine) include modafinil and methylphenidate (Ritalin).

Stimulants in general and various antidementives, anxiolytics, empathogens, types of microdosing (mainly of psychedelics), and antidepressants may also fall into the scope of neuroenhancement despite not necessarily being considered nootropics.

Although consideration of individual neuroenhancement agents is usually triggered by success in clinical and technological fields, they have also been used to attempt to help people with a lack of normal cognitive, motor, and affective abilities: for example, social skills and empathy. In this case, neuroenhancement drugs try to increase oxytocin and decrease cortisol levels helping people better their communication and social interaction skills.

Neuroenhancement is not only concerned with, short- and longer-term, enhancement of intelligence (by various types of measures), learning (e.g. general memory enhancement), focus/flow-state, and related cognitive domains or measures but also:
 mood ('mood enhancement')
 motivation ('motivation enhancement'; e.g. apathy-related, in goal-setting, will to power, anhedonia or for exercise)
 task-enjoyment
 sociability (e.g. talking-related or empathy)
 substituting and/or ending unhealthy substances use (substance use disorders or low/moderate consumption)
 discipline or will-power and self-control
 creativity
 cognitive endurance (cognitive work endurance and fatigue resistance)
 specific capacities and skills such as verbal fluency, types of problem-solving, reasoning, simple and complex reaction time, and so on
 psychological resilience
 and more

Enhancers are multidimensional and can be clustered into biochemical, physical, and behavioral enhancement strategies. N-acetylcysteine (NAC) is an example of a low side effects cognitive enhancer relevant to both unhealthy substance use change and mood stabilization.

Modafinil

Modafinil is a wakefulness-promoting drug that decreases fatigue, increases vigilance, reduces daytime sleepiness, and improves mood. Modafinil is currently licensed for treating patients with disorders such as narcolepsy, sleep apnea, and shift work sleep disorder. This drug also seems promising in the treatment of depression and bipolar disorder. Modafinil is currently being used by United States Air Force personnel for missions of great duration in an attempt to decrease fatigue amongst aircrew. It has become more popular amongst the general public. In an online poll conducted by Nature magazine, 8.8% of 1400 corresponding readers admitted use of modafinil for non-medical reasons. Their reasoning behind its use was for increasing concentration and focus on a specific task or to counteract sleep deficit and jetlag. A comparison between the sales of modafinil to the number of patients revealed a disproportionate ratio, indicating high abuse.

Modafinil has been reported to improve executive function in healthy non-sleep-deprived individuals, as well as potentially improving attention and learning and memory. Effects on sleep-deprived individuals are even more striking: a single dose resulted in enhanced wakefulness, executive functions, and memory. In the case of sustained sleep deprivation, repeated intake of modafinil helped individuals maintain higher levels of wakefulness than the placebo, but did not help attention and executive function. Since the majority of these trials were conducted on military personnel, further research needs to be conducted on the effects of modafinil on the general population. Modafinil may impair one's self-monitoring ability. A common trend found in research studies indicated that participants rated their performances on cognitive tests higher than it was, suggesting an "overconfidence" effect.

Modafinil is becoming increasingly popular among the general population. Apart from a consumer's want to increase his neurological performance, there are financial incentives for manufacturers as well. Modafinil has a market share of more than $700 million a year, indicating a high degree of off-label use. Modafinil is also one of the more easily available neuroenhancement drugs in the market today. Modafinil can be bought from many websites – mostly from Asian countries – as well as from darknet markets. Modafinil first came into public attention when world champion runner Kelli White was tested positive for illegally consuming modafinil in the Athletics World Championship in 2003, resulting in the loss of her two gold medals.

For research comparing modafinil with similar compounds, investigating combinations and showing trade-off type issues, see #Research topics below.

Methylphenidate

Methylphenidate (MPH), also known as Ritalin, is a stimulant that is used to treat attention-deficit hyperactivity disorder (ADHD). MPH is known to be highly abused by the general population, especially college students. In an online poll conducted by Nature magazine, 12.4% of 1400 corresponding readers admitted use of MPH for non-medical reasons. Their reasoning behind its use was for increasing concentration, sleep deficit, and jetlag.

A comparison between the sales of MPH to the number of patients revealed a disproportionate ratio, indicating high abuse. MPH is believed to have a positive effect on memory consolidation, but studies have not been able to conclusively verify this claim. Popular opinion that MPH enhances attention could not be verified. Studies of MPH have reported improved problem-solving skills. However, when these studies were repeated to replicate the results, the placebo group scored higher, indicating that MPH may even impair performance.

These inconclusive, and generally negative, results for memory improvement are insufficient to explain the use of MPH for non-medical reasons. Users may have motives other than genuine neuroenhancement that propels its unprescribed use, such as subjective and recreational effects. The lack of any result, positive or negative, indicated that the 10–20 mg dosage may be too low for the drug. Further studies need to be conducted, looking at different doses of MPH.

Memantine

Memantine is an NMDA receptor antagonist and is used to treat patients with moderate to severe Alzheimer's disease, but is also used as a neuroenhancement drug. 
Studies conducted on memantine were unable to conclusively verify neuroenhancement capability of the drug. Since most of these studies were single-dose tests of memantine, it is possible that these drugs would only show some effect, positive or negative, after continuous intake. Until then, single-dose studies of memantine are not enough to reveal the drug's actual potential.

Donepezil

Donepezil is an acetylcholinesterase inhibitor (AChEI) that is used to treat patients with mild to moderate Alzheimer's disease. While many AChEIs could be potential neuroenhancement substances, donepezil is the most commonly used AChEIs by the general population due to its widespread use for treating Alzheimer's disease.

Most studies on donepezil are unable to conclusively verify the neuroenhancement capability of the drug. In such studies, it was seen participants who took donepezil scored higher than those that took the placebo. Donepezil helps individuals retain training tasks, verbal memory, and episodic memory. In sleep deprivation studies, while donepezil had no effect on well-rested patients, it had a positive effect on patients with 24 hours of sleep deprivation. Such patients benefited from increased memory performance and attention that would otherwise be a deficit in such sleep-deprived conditions. However, this effect was only seen in individuals whose performance declined significantly due to sleep deprivation.

Research and candidates

Research also explores derivatives (such as N-acetylcysteine amide for NAC) of already existing cognitive enhancers that have or could have higher bioavailability. Another approach to enhance efficacy or potency or selectivity that is relevant to medications in general is  drug delivery, including enabling additional routes of administration such as via nanoemulsions for "nose-to-brain" drug delivery.

Differential half-lives may also be a topic of research and development. Modafinil substantially increases alertness but, having a long half-life of approximately 13 hours, can delay or impair sleep-onset, with there being no marketed shorter-acting version. According to two 2009 studies, armodafinil is eliminated approximately three times more slowly than the S-isomer of racemic modafinil.

Research may also investigate:
 general safety and efficacy in healthy people in particular as well as for long-term use and also using neuroimaging (and associated brain mapping and neuroimaging intelligence testing)
 Studies may also measure impacts of regular consumption of chemicals like modafinil on mortality and lifespan in animal models, such as short-lived mice.
 different protocols (e.g. dosages, timing and scheduling)
 combinations (e.g. concurrent, cyclic or sequential and precursors, depletions and cofactors)
One common combination under research is the concurrent combination of l-theanine with caffeine.
One study investigated high-dosage modafinil combined with low-dosage caffeine – 200 mg of each.
There are also studies combing different types of cognitive enhancers such as biochemical and behavioral enhancers such as modafinil combined with meditation
The multinutrient intervention of uridine combined with choline (CDP-choline or e.g. in eggs) and omega 3 (e.g. in fish) has synergy, improving some measures of cognition and mood
 factors of effects outcomes (including situational, task-difficulty, personal (e.g. genetic or baseline-skill-levels), protocol-related, etc)
 interactions (e.g. polypharmacy and combinations)
 trade-off-type issues
Modafinil can, at or around the time of consumption:
impair sleep due to its long half-life 
(slightly) increase the resting heart rate and blood pressure
impair some types of creativity but possibly be beneficial in some creativity domains or creative tasks (like e.g. literary fiction writing)
both decrease or increase anxiety
have a possible effect of overconfidence
have risks for side effects like headache and have low abuse/addiction potential
Some pharmacological agents may have issues due to which some may consider them as not viable for enhancement or not consider them to be neuroenhancers – for example "nicotine and amphetamines (such as Adderall)" may result "in substantial loss of cholinergic and dopaminergic receptor responsivity and may ultimately lead to their epigenetic downregulation" . Various recreational drugs are partly used due to cognitive enhancement effects on e.g. sociability, mood and/or creativity – in the exemplary case of alcohol this can have substantial effects on health, including long-term negative consequences on cognitive functions. They can also induce tolerance for the effects and addiction could develop from long-term drug instrumentalization.
Enhancing memory for example may come at the cost of other cognitive domains and if it is for example enhanced during the wrong times, resultant memories may be more "noisy". Forgetting and/or low memorization may be beneficial with current constraints and enhancing either could be beneficial in many situations or nonpathological issues. There also is the concept of "enhancement through diminishment" that via addition-by-subtraction interferes with the function of brain regions that are. . This concept is not to be confused with the "cognitive diminishment" described in #Cognitive diminishment and the "neurodiminishing" described below.
There is a possibility that in the future the use of neuroenhancement tools is exploited by adverserial forces or malicious entities to negatively influence performance, called "neurodiminishing" – potentially a form of neurological warfare (also called "neurowarfare"; overlapping or synonymous with "cognitive warfare") beyond the enhancement of troops' capacities, for example via electronic warfare, hacking, directed energy sources manipulation, or other methods. 
 differential effects (e.g. comparisons between substances/strategies and per task, cognitive domain or purpose)
For example, it was found that methylphenidate (Ritalin) increases alertness more on simple tasks than on difficult ones, while modafinil increases concentration or attention, reportedly may significantly outperform methylphenidate "for cognitive enhancement in healthy individuals, 'especially on people undergoing sleep deprivation'", and is thought to also have an impact on decision-making, planning, moral reasoning and motivation. Modafinil has replaced dextroamphetamine in certain types of military operations due to its superior side effects profile.
development of more adequate tests or measures about positive effects
 A study notes that there is a problem of "how to define cognition and whether or not it can be understood in simple computational terms", calling for "studies testing whether putative enhancers improve the performance of sophisticated (highly experienced) subjects dealing with novel circumstances of great complexity and without the benefit of external supervision", which could "bring experiments closer to the human condition and thereby help explain why animal studies on cognition and memory have such a poor record in predicting human outcomes".
 Neuroimaging could also be used, including for analysis of long-term impacts
use of and/or more advanced and/or more accessible technologies for "nutrition assessment (eg, metabolomics and innovative methods of dietary intake assessment) and recently identified biomarkers of nutrition and neurobiological outcomes" for prevention of cognitive impairment as in screening
general underlying neurobiology such as the neurobiological neurobiology underlying types of creativity or attention and focus (attentional processing) – e.g. neurotransmitter systems, neuropeptides, gene expression, neurotrophins, brain metabolites, neuroimaging/network-mapping/neuroanatomy, etc

Intrabrain bioengineering

Advanced cognitive enhancement that is not viable for use by humans in the near future could build upon research in which receptors to activate or inhibit neurons with proteins were designed, e.g. using "Designer Receptors Exclusively Activated by Designer Drugs" (DREADD). Genetically modified neurons may enable connecting external components to nerves. Researcher reported in 2020 that they bioengineered C. elegans worms to synthesize, fabricate, and assemble bioelectronic materials in its brain cells. They enabled modulation of membrane properties in specific neuron populations and manipulation of behavior in the living animals.

If organic neuromorphic devices reach a certain point and become biocompatible, novel brain implants could be possible. There also is research of potentially implantable physical artificial neurons. Bioimplants of genetically engineered or stem-cell grown neural tissue may become possible as well.

Dietary components and supplements

Various compounds contained in foods or consumed in isolated forms or herbs such as cinnamon, cocoa powder, anthocyanins (e.g. in bilberry and black elderberry), dietary nitrate (in beet root), epicatechin, levodopa l-phenylalanine and l-tyrosine, phenethylamine (PEA), carotenoids like lycopene (in tomato sauce), l-theanine, apigenin (and chamomile), ginger, herbal infusions (notably lemon balm, rosemary, peppermint and caffeinated drinks), rhodiola rosea, creatine, omega 3 (e.g. sustainably algae-derived), and other nutrients and phytonutrients as well as correction of prevalent micronutrient deficiencies are investigated for potential minor but significant or additive impacts on cognition (e.g. mild stimulation and/or mood modulation) in healthy non-old individuals. 

The dietary component glucose (and its glycogen form) is the main energy source for the brain, with some researchers considering it a "[b]iochemical enhancer" despite of the health impacts of direct consumption. A constant supply of it is needed and simple sugars can spike blood glucose and their glucose supply does not last long. Slowly absorbed carbohydrate-containing food or low-GI food would lead to a slower release of glucose than a quickly absorbed or high-GI food. There is very little research on links between brain glucose metabolism and cognition, despite it also being relevant to neurodegenerative disorders. Lactate (released especially during specific types of exercise) may also be relevant to cognitive enhancement.

Medications

Some medications like widely used sociability-related GABA receptor agonist phenibut can have durable major side-effects and addiction potential for some at least at some dosages, albeit not necessarily. Other notable repurposed chemicals already widely in use for other purposes and with potential viability for neuroenhancement but in most cases no or few/small trials with healthy non-old humans, limited research on side-effects and/or unvalidated effect-sizes include: CBD, nicergoline, huperzine-A, DMAE and meclofenoxate, vinpocetine, palmitoylethanolamide (PEA), and pyritinol.

Non-pharmacological

Neurostimulation
Neurostimulation methods are being researched and developed. Results indicate details of the stimulation procedures are crucial, with some applications impairing rather than enhancing cognition and questions being raised about whether this approach can deliver any meaningful results for cognitive domains. Stimulation methods include electrical stimulation, magnetic stimulation, optical stimulation with lasers, several forms of acoustic stimulation, and physical methods like forms of neurofeedback. There are ideas to integrate such headgear into helmets.

Transcranial direct current stimulation
While neuroenhancement drugs are a potential method for cognitive performance enhancement, transcranial direct current stimulation (tDCS) over the motor cortex (MC) is being seen as another potential method. Although it was originally intended to help patients with brain injuries such as stroke, there has been a lot of interest in the last few years on tDCS's capabilities for healthy individuals as well. Recent studies have already shown improved neuroplasticity from tDCS to facilitate motor learning in young humans, and it may be possible to apply this method to the older segment of the workforce as well.

Stimulating higher cognitive functions of the brain, such as the language function, with tDCS in one study resulted in improved word retrieval. tDCS works by enhancing the connectivity in a given stimulated network, providing neural efficiency in highly specific brain areas critical for task performance. During this time, fMRI images also showed reduced activity in the semantic retrieval processes, suggesting more efficient processing in task-critical areas of the brain. Reduced activity in circumscribed task-related areas has been attributed to consolidation of motor learning and superior memory performance. New research in tDCS is trying to localize the stimulation to affect the desired subset of highly specific task-relevant neurons. In 2022, scientists demonstrated that transcranial alternating current stimulation (tACS) can, depending on the frequency, for one month improve (either) short-term memory or long-term memory in 65–88-years-old people.

Deep brain stimulation

Deep brain stimulation (DBS) is another form of neuroenhancement. Unlike tDCS, though, DBS involves the implantation of a medical device, and is restricted for use for only a few, severe diseases such as Parkinson's disease and dystonia. In one study, DBS improved movement by 39%, reduced disability by 38%, and improved quality of life by 30% for patients with dystonia over a course of 3 months. The patients had a reduction in dystonia symptoms by 50%. Improvement was noticeable within hours to days after DBS application. The benefits of DBS as of now are far more than those of high-dosage trihexyphenidyl, a powerful drug used in the treatment for dystonia.

Brainwave entrainment

A study showed that a "visual flicker paradigm to entrain individuals at their own brain rhythm (i.e. peak alpha frequency)" resulted in substantially faster perceptual visual learning, maintained the day following training. In particular, the entrainment substantially accelerated learning (this group "improved at least three times faster than control groups") in a discrimination task to detect targets embedded in background clutter or to identify radial vs. concentric Glass patterns embedded in noise compared to entrainment that does not match an individual's alpha frequency.

Conventional methods and foundational strategies

Enhancement can also be based on conventional methods; this may be considered neuroenhancement if they are targeted, especially when they are applied to an advanced level or if they are considered from a collective public health intervention perspective. From this perspective, "failing to encourage the pursuit of healthy behaviours" has "adverse effects on population cognitive health". Conventional methods include those that delay or mitigate brain aging (which is one major preoccupation of neuro-enhancement), including adequate sleep, optimized diet , and physical activity (which has many neuroeffects). However, they may also be considered as "co-strategies" in parallel to "neuroenhancement", rather than as techniques of cognitive enhancement. Conventional cognitive enhancement methods and "more direct neuromodulatory methods" could be used together (e.g. environmental enrichment and nootropics) for desired effects. 

Cognitively stimulating and social activities can also have positive effects on the brain.

Environmental factors

Environmental protection measures can also protect or enhance cognitive abilities – for example studies have well-validated extensive harmful effects of ubiquitous air pollution (outdoor and e.g. PM2.5 and  concentrations indoor) and shown that half of the US population has been exposed to substantially detrimental lead levels in early childhood (mainly from car exhaust whose lead pollution peaked in the 1970s and caused widespread loss in cognitive ability).

Education- and time-use-related
Development of education may also be part of neuroenhancement. Results in neuroscience and software – e.g. AI – can be relevant to this development. Lifelong learning may be considered a way of cognitive enhancement. For the scope of neuroenhancement relating to education and work, see #Scope for cognitive enhancement.

How people spend their time or activities may have major effects on cognition (and vice versa) and be modulatable in various non-pharmacological ways such as decision-making, prioritization, routines, reflective practices, reasoning-related technologies, gamification, incentives (e.g. economics, economic policy, media policy, curricula, social feedback, norms, etc), and so on. One review suggests that including motivation enhancement measures "such as motivational interviewing and the use of rewards or incentives" makes interventions substantially more successful in achieving improvements in health behaviours. Exemplary activities include sleep, wage labour work, school, social media, TV, volunteering, boredom, exercise, social activities and hobbies.

Time-use
There is time-use research and research on various types of media uses on cognition. Impacts of screen time as well as play behavior on cognitinon may depend heavily on the types of activities, contexts, substituted activities and contents. 

Motivations to make use of pharmacological cognitive enhancers include "time optimization" and "increase in time awake". Time requirements for neuroenhancers may be an important factor in their selection or adoption.

Education and cognition 
Integration of digital tool use may increase cognitive capacity and flexibility, lower cognitive load and foster digital fluency. Skills in critical thinking, technology-supported inquiry learning, scientific reasoning abilities (e.g. compare with religious education and the "cognitive style of religious thinking") and problem-solving may be related to the cognitive domain or represent "metacognitive skills". Improvements to education could be considered cognitive enhancements and "educators" may commonly commit to a fallacy whereby it is assumed that if "individual distinct cognitive processes can be enhanced [...] [this] must enhance cognition overall" when they deploy "'teaching to the test'" and prioritize "memorization over generalizable skills such as critical thinking and problem solving".

Another facet of education from a neurological perspective is integration of neuroenhancement options (behavioral, pharmacological, or devices) in learning in specific or in various types of learning (e.g. by students, retrainees or military personnel), which could be part of evidence-based learning and is concerned with ensuring applied methods are safe, effective and used in the right way (potentially including personalization) for the right purposes at the right time during the learning processes. In contrast, a DIY-approach , rather than guided ones, requires at least extensive research by the person seeking to enhance cognition.

Software and media

Educational software may also fall into the scope of neuroenhancement (which may depend on the kinds or types of use or features of such). Applications of augmented reality technologies  are investigated for general memory enhancement, extending perception and learning-assistance. 

The Internet is sometimes considered as a "" or as enabling "Internet-extended cognition" or "Web-extended minds" or "human-extended machine cognition". However, it is not "a simple, uniform technology, [n]either in its composition, [n]or in its use" and as "an informational resource currently fails to enhance cognition", partly due to issues that include information overload, misinformation and persuasive design. Substantial neuroenhancement potential therefore may lie in measures such as individual empowerment (possibly via existing education systems), software development and better collaborative systems for sorting and categorizing information.

One trial investigated a smartphone motivation enhancement application "promoting lifestyle improvement for brain health".

What could be described as "human-computer symbiosis" already permeates daily life, including for example humans' use of Web search software for research or machine translation. A "gradual transition from document-centric to more data-centric modes of information representation", as envisioned by Semantic Web developments, could "provide new opportunities for cognitive augmentation and enhancement". This would enable targeted retrieval of specific pieces of task-relevant information and highly flexible modes of information display, in a way that is more advanced or integrated than conventional desktop computer Web search querying, which is further complicated by that Web research, media literacy and sophisticated use of literature- and Web-search engines and tools are typically not part of curricula. Downsides of "merger[s]" with ICTs, often called or misidentified as "AI" in the literature and media, may currently include "loss of privacy, political polarization, psychological manipulation, addictive use, social anxiety and distraction, misinformation, and mass narcissism" and cause – societally detrimental forms of – harm to mental health and well-being. AI can enhance artists' creative process or creativity. It has been speculated that AI could monitor and advise via factors that affect moral decision-making as one form of moral enhancement. Externalizing or "offloading" information into an external artefact, especially digital ones, allows people to materialize their thoughts, thereby overcoming the limitations of brains. Whether or not technologies are currently "enhancing the way we think and reason, and thus [are] making us smarter" or not (cognitive diminishment) is a topic of debate and research (or more precisely determinants, factors and impacts), and may depend on changable factors such as:
 whether their design is public
 ethical frameworks for design
 policy
 systematic incentives and mechanisms of the contemporary socio-economy which facilitate or determine their use/adoption, patterns of use, success/production, creation/feasibility, and quality
 incentives and mechanisms that are built into the technologies or inherent to them (these may be interdependent with surrounding infrastructures, transparency/product information, standards, design- and policy-decisions that are based on the prior socioeconomic incentives, assessments-/ratings-mechanisms, life-cycle analyses, and metadata)

Early childhood

Nutrition also plays an important role during early brain development.

A 2021 study showed that the Abecedarian Early Intervention Project resulted in significant changes in midlife brain structure in males. MRI scans showed that several brain regions' and total brain volumes were substantially larger in participants of the childcare program than in the control group.

Protection from pollutions (such as direct and indirect vehicular pollution) appears to be of special importance during and before early childhood, with age being the largest factors that affect neurotoxic outcomes for a given pollution .

Concerning aforementioned screen use, children's exposure to computers as part of school curricula is important to the development of computer literacy.

Play behavior may also extend to the choice of toys, as social-emotional and cognitive skills are developed and enhanced as children play. A study recommends toys that encourage the child to be mentally and physically active. For example, construction toys like Meccano could facilitate children to learn skills that are embedded in the act of designing and creative thinking. Stimulation of creativity during childhood "enhances cognition and even can alter the brain both anatomically and physiologically".

Other
Correction of mild dehydration (which may be especially relevant when chemicals like modafinil have been consumed), listening to various types of music and other audio (e.g. ambient music, binaural beats or soundscapes for focus and other types for mood, motivation or alertness) or noise-reduction, and intake of –  – fruits (and possibly nuts) can have immediate (acute) significant effects depending on various factors.

Targeted microbiome alterations such as via various psychobiotics, meditation, and physical relaxation techniques like  could have longer-term effects, albeit the research on these interventions is at an early stage with few human trials – which may be needed to, for example, identify beneficial bacterial species and strains to include in a probiotic – despite a study reportedly first showing that the gut microbiota can be a therapeutic target for cognitive enhancement in the year 2011.

Research also investigates differences between adults' learning and children's learning which may enable interventions to selectively enhance learning in adults and children.

Sleep-related

The role of sleep in learning can be leveraged by interventions such as "targeting specific neurotransmitter systems pharmacologically", "stimulating sleep-specific brain oscillations" and "cueing memory reactivation during sleep", including via "[o]lfactory and auditory cues".

Desynchronized circadian rhythms have detrimental effects on cognition. In learning and skill development, the sleep episode following initial skill practice is important for consolidation. Sleep evasion which may be useful for increasing time available and wakefulness can be studied in a variety of ways. Sleep is investigated for potential ways to leverage it for acutely (e.g. via complex analogical problem solving or sleep onset periods as creative sweet spots) or chonically improving types of creativity.

There is research into interventions to enhance sleep as in improving sleep quality, efficiency (sleep latency), and duration (e.g. 7–8 hours for most adults in specific but depending on factors that include genetics, possibly (preceding) exhausting physical activity and possibly factors of "perceived sleep needs").

Candidate tools or targets for modulation (technological, legal, pharmacological, or otherwise) include glycine, melatonin (which can have side effects), diet and exercise, post-waking cognitive effort such as via alarm clocks that are deactivated by solving simple puzzles, neuromodulation sleeping caps, lemon balm, tryptophan, valerian, ashwagandha, caffeine- and meal-timing, circadian rhythm adherence, lightning, screen-use and blue light reduction before sleep, and various optimal sleep environment characteristics (which may include indoor air quality, thermal properties of bedding, temperature, noise, and outdoor light at night).

Augmented reality

Applications of augmented reality technologies are investigated for:
 general memory enhancement
 providing "just in time" information
 parallel quadcopter operation
 enhancement to detect, classify, and successfully manage (e.g. engage) threats
 spatial awareness
 enhancing visual and multisensory perception
 learning-assistance

Challenges for adoption include "short- and long-term risks of distraction, mental workload, visual occlusion, and technology-induced complacency and skill degradation".

Genetic enhancement
A potential future biochemical strategy for cognitive enhancement is human genetic enhancement which has only been preliminarily, but successfully, tested in animal models and is currently not an available enhancement option to researchers.

Candidate target genes

A neurogenetics genome-wide association study (GWAS) meta-analysis investigated genetic correlations of language-related skills, reporting genetic factors of, the so far uniquely human, language-related capabilities, in particular factors of differences in skill-levels of five tested traits. It also used neuroanatomy/neuroimaging data. However, correlations are not to be equated with causal factors and causal factors are neither independent from surrounding factors of society nor necessarily exclusively beneficial.

Side effects
Common neuroenhancement drugs are typically well tolerated by healthy humans. These drugs are already in mainstream use to treat patients with different kinds of psychiatric disorders. Since most of the information on neuroenhancements and their capabilities are drawn from research experiments, the best way to determine adverse effects are drop-out rates and subjective rating. The drop-out rates were minimal or non-existent for donepezil, memantine, MPH, and modafinil.
In the drug trials, participants reported the following adverse reactions to the consumption of donepezil, memantine, MPH, or modafinil: gastrointestinal complaints (nausea), headache, dizziness, nightmares, anxiety, drowsiness, nervousness, restlessness, sleep disturbances, and insomnia. The side effects normally ceased in the course of treatment.
Although there were no reported side effects from DBS, 18% of the patients reported device-related complications such as infections due to lead dislodgment or breakage. Various factors such as dosage, timing and concurrent behavior may shape or determine the appearance of side-effects. There may be risks of dehydration (inadequate concurrent hydration). However, there also is widespread usage of cognitive enhancers whose long-term and/or short-term effects on health are nearly entirely unknown or which are known to be unhealthy.

Ethical, social and legal issues

Adverse health impacts and dependence

Parents and healthcare providers are concerned about the safety and well-being of those that consume various neuroenhancements. 

In a 2011 article by Jayne Lucke, the concept of neuroenhancement is compared to sildenafil. The author states that "recreational users of [sildenafil] had lower confidence in their ability to achieve an erection than non-users, even though they had a significantly better erectile function. They become psychologically dependent on these drugs." The author believes a similar issue can be seen in neuroenhancement users. Moreover, expectations or overestimations regarding the effectiveness of interventions can exceed their actual effects and they can induce overconfidence.

If more and more people begin enhancing their minds, people may "eventually feel subtly coerced into enhancing themselves in order to remain competitive in school or the workplace" or in the military, or experience types of peer-pressure.

Dubljević stated that "making sure that users are well informed, tracking any adverse effects and generating funds (e.g., via taxation or fees) to address related social problems is crucial", suggesting governments could also play a more active role in the addressing of neuroenhancement challenges.

In health systems where production does not sufficiently adjust as in increasing production and reducing production-costs, neuroenhancement may lead to "prescription drug diversion". One review hypothesizes that the limited number of recent randomized controlled trials with healthy people in particular could partly be explained by (it being influenced by) the media and bioethics literature surrounding pharmaceutical cognitive enhancement in healthy subjects.

Validation and quality control

There appears to be a lack of various requirements, quality standards, validation and authentication, sampling and lab testing for cognitive enhancers including dietary supplements, (other) chemicals and (other) therapeutic goods, which may be the result of public safety-governance failure. This means that if a user is perfectly aware of the current state of science on the risks and benefits of a chemical and personal factors, there can still be risks that the product consumed differs from its label or has a lower quality which in some cases can be dangerous, especially if such are not available through large established shops which have more to lose, albeit this assumes such threats to safety are always unintentional and limited to producers and/or retailers (like online pharmacies).

Well-being and productivity
The ethical benefits of neuroenhancement include potentials to improve well-being, reduce unhealthy substance use, further educational aims, increase societal productivity in constructive sectors (also relevant to well-being and they may support socioeconomic shifts by "enabling more complex, productive, and inherently fulfilling forms of cooperation"), enable self-amelioration of widespread mild cognitive deficiencies in cognitively normal individuals, and increase incentives for and the effort behind the development of medical therapies, mainly chemicals, that can benefit people affected by various brain diseases, and in some cases other diseases, such as Alzheimer's disease, and by brain aging. Various cognitive enhancement options (such as dietary and/or pharmacological) could also be protective against such pathologies as in preventive healthcare.

Diversity and inequality
Neuroenhancement is often seen analogous to the issue of doping in sports, due to which it is sometimes called brain doping. A common concern raised is an unfair advantage of people who consume enhancing drugs over people who don't. Many athletes, however, feel that the only way for them to win against athletes that take performance-enhancing drugs (PED) is for them to take PEDs as well; a similar thought process has developed within the general population in regard to people that consume neuroenhancement drugs. In a research study of 18- to 34-year-olds, 50% of them had little or no objection to the concept of doping. Students, in particular, often feel that cognitive neuroenhancers are acceptable.

Generally, the moral acceptability (including fairness perceptions) of such substances for the purpose of neuroenhancement are an important factor in the decision to use or not use such drugs. Studies found that moral objections against such substances strongly decrease the willingness to use them.

Many argue that the only option for regulation of neuroenhancements is to allow it to everyone, thus minimizing cheating. Banning the drugs, on the other hand, may have detrimental consequences to society. Not only would it create a black market, amplifying issues caused by illicit use, it would also increase the cost to society from enforcing the law. Neuroenhancement drugs need to be assessed further for their merits and adverse effects, making it easier for policy-makers to make a call on the regulation of such drugs.

In general, cognitive diversity – or some "optimum range of diversity" – was found highly valuable. Novel capabilities due to progress in science and technology may raise related ethical issues. There have also been speculations that cognitive enhancement technologies (CETs) may increase population-level cognitive diversity, e.g. as different people will choose to enhance different aspects of their cognition. Moreover, cognitive enhancements might decrease inequality, e.g. by "leveling the playing field" as well as narrowing the inequality of the "genetic lottery".

Distributive justice

Another issue is that of distributive justice, concerned with "who will have access to new cognitive enhancement techniques, and who can experience the cognitive benefits". A main factor in the costs of cognitive enhancers is their patentability. Online pharmacies can substantially reduce costs, raise affordability or enable consumers to purchase certain products at all. Naturally occurring agents (contained in small amounts in foods) may offer" more options to patients who may be of poor socioeconomic backgrounds, or are residents of poorer nations". Allen Buchanan in a book suggested that "we should embrace the opportunities provided by this emerging pharmacological technology and devote our resources to ensuring that such drugs that are developed and tested properly [e.g. see confounding, reproducibility, #Research topics and cognitive test] and that access to them is equal and open to avoid injustices and the development of black markets".

Cognitive liberty and autonomy

Human rights
A new human right to cognitive liberty has been proposed by researchers earlier and Nita A. Farahany as "an update to other existing human rights to privacy, freedom of thought and self-determination", partly because some neuroenhancement technologies could possibly also be used for ways like "involuntary neural surveillance" (including for business purposes), be vulnerable to hacking or used for manipulation. Others have suggested "the right to cognitive liberty, the right to mental privacy, the right to mental integrity, and the right to psychological continuity". In 2021 Chile became the first country to approve neurolaw that establishes rights to personal identity, free will and mental privacy.

In popular culture
Neuroenhancement drugs play a key role in some novels and movies, such as Limitless (2011), which may to some degree probe and explore opportunities and threats of using neuro-enhancers in an imaginative way.

Scope for cognitive enhancement

Major preoccupations of neuro-enhancement include optimization of child development factors and delaying, reversing or mitigating brain aging.

Proponents of cognitive enhancement have argued that there are vast potential benefits for the workforce, especially for the older segment. Mainly due to advances in medical technology over the last century, the average human life expectancy has increased significantly. Demographics for developed countries indicate rapid growth of the older segment of the workforce. Advancing age generally shows a pattern in the reduction of the ability to acquire new skills, but integration in the industry today requires employees to be able to acquire and retain new skills more than ever before. With an increase in the ageing population comes an increase in the economic, social, and health burden of age-related disorders and diseases.

A review noted that "even healthy [non-old] individuals who normally function well, are not always performing normally due to sleep deprivation, jet lag, or other stressors, and some might need cognitive enhancers to perform at their best possible level on some occasions". Neuroenhancement thus is concerned with improving capacities in various cognitive domains to approximate their best possible level at more and specific times as well as raising that level, and improving neuropsychological weaknesses or mild deficits that are not diseases.

Concerning public policy and neuroenhancement-related institutionalized structures like education systems, it is not known whether the scope of neuroenhancement also includes the purposes and content that cognition is enhanced for – the ends of cognitive enhancement such as curricula learned in educational institutions or ultimate purposes of tasks at workplaces or, by extension, the methods and frameworks by which such are e.g. selected. It also has not been clarified whether cognitive enhancement also encompasses behavioral interventions or methods (such as mnemonic techniques like the method of loci) and differential teaching modes and methods, albeit some studies indicate behavioral interventions fall into the scope of neuroenhancement.

Neurohacking and DIY

In neuroenhancement, the human brain conceived of as a malleable "wetware".

Online communities
The Reddit forum (subreddit) on nootropics has many readers and, along with many other related subreddits, enables communication including about topics or questions not yet studied directly or not easily findable in health information on the Internet, experience-based exchange, nootropic-based discussion, and other content for users of cognitive enhancers, which may include marketing. It is an unstructured accessible source of information from past and present users. Researchers have analyzed reports on these websites, such as conducting content analysis of the subreddit r/microdosing. One study used such an approach to highlight some of the gaps in the scientific literature, suggesting "main uses [of memantine] identified on reddit.com were not reported in the medical literature" and provided some data on the usage patterns reported there .

Opinion

General public
The opinion of the general public on the issue of neuroenhancement is scattered. In general, the younger population under the age of 25 feel that neuroenhancements are acceptable or that the decision lies in the hand of that individual. Healthcare officials and parents feel concerned due to safety factors, lack of complete information on these drugs, and possible irreversible adverse effects. Such concerns have been shown to reduce the willingness to take such drugs.

A 2016 German study among 6.454 employees found a rather low life-time prevalence of cognitive enhancement drug use (namely 2.96%), while the willingness to take such drugs was found in every tenth respondent (10.45%). Studies have estimated that between 7–9% of the college population in the United States consumes neuroenhancement drugs. Some studies estimate this figure to be as high as 12% or even 20%. A large-scale survey using a random sample of more than 5.000 German university students found a relatively low 30-days prevalence of 1.2%, 2.3% indicated the use of such drugs within the last 6 months, 3.2% within the last 12 months and during 4.6% during their lifetime, respectively. Of those students, who used such substances during the last 6 months, 39.4% reported their use once in this period, 24.2% twice, 12.1% three times and 24.2% more than three times. It has been shown that consumers of neuroenhancement drugs are much more willing to also use them in the future, e.g. due to positive experiences or a tendency towards addiction. Students primarily attribute consumption of these drugs for increased concentration, improved alertness, or to "get high". Neuroenhancement drug users rated the positive potential of neuroenhancement drugs higher than non-users, and rated the adverse effects of these drugs lower than non-users, showing more confidence in the result of these drugs. In a survey of 1324 German students, 32% of participants that do not consume neuroenhancement drugs felt they had positive cognitive effects while 12% felt they had a relaxation effect. In contrast, 54% of participants that do consume neuroenhancement drugs felt they had a positive cognitive effect while 25% felt they had a relaxation effect.

The need to remain "alert" and "focused" can also be seen in the trend of caffeine consumption. The caffeine consumption for both students and the general population of the US is around 90%. Students who consume neuroenhancements also had a higher frequency of consuming psychoactive lifestyle drugs such as cannabis.

A study among German university teachers (including professors) found a very low prevalence of neuroenhancement drug use. Only 0.9% of the respondents reported the use of such drugs. However, 10% of the respondents are willing to take such drugs in the future, which might indicate a potential increase of the prevalence. One reason to use such drugs was work-related stress.

Physicians
Physicians play an important role in determining the potential abuse of neuroenhancing drugs. While some neuroenhancing drugs do not require a prescription and are easily available, others that require a prescription are up to the discretion of the physician. In a survey conducted among Swiss psychiatrists and general practitioners, the majority of surveyed physicians agreed that their criteria to determine whether or not a dysfunction should be considered a disease is if the patient indicates subjective suffering and/or negative consequences for the everyday ability to work. The surveyed physicians, however, were in majority agreement that they do not prescribe medication without a clear indication of such a dysfunction.

See also
 Bioeconomy#Medicine, nutritional science and the health economy
 Cognitive development
 Cyborg
 Development of the nervous system in humans#Adult neural development
 Intelligence amplification
 List of drugs used by militaries
 Neurogenesis
 Neuroplasticity#Types
 Neuroprotection
 Superintelligence#Feasibility of biological superintelligence
 Wearable technology
 
 
Concepts and topics related to neurodiminishment
 Criticism of democracy#Criticism of Process
 Dumbing down
 Dysgenics
 Indoctrination
 Internet manipulation
 Media studies
 Content (media)
 Misinformation
 Neuromarketing
 Decline of civilization#Theories
Other (currently not included) and sub-types
 Alertness
 Anabolic steroid#Neurosteroid activity
 Anorectic
 Aphrodisiac
 Insomnia#Management
 Metacognition
 Painkiller
 Relaxation (psychology)#Techniques

References

Further reading 
 
 
 

Cognition
Intelligence
Neuroscience
Neurotechnology
Mind
Transhumanism